The following outline is provided as an overview of and topical guide to the U.S. state of Maine:

Maine – state in the New England region of the northeastern United States, bordered by the Atlantic Ocean to the east and south, New Hampshire to the west, and the Canadian provinces of Quebec to the northwest and New Brunswick to the northeast.  Maine is both the northernmost and easternmost portion of New England. It is known for its scenery—its jagged, mostly rocky coastline, its low, rolling mountains, its heavily forested interior and picturesque waterways—as well as for its seafood cuisine, especially lobsters and clams.

General reference 

 Names
 Common name: Maine
 Pronunciation: 
 Official name: State of Maine
 Abbreviations and name codes
 Postal symbol:  ME
 ISO 3166-2 code:  US-ME
 Internet second-level domain:  .me.us
 Nicknames
 Vacationland (currently used on license plates)
 Pine Tree State
 Adjectival: Maine
 Demonyms
 Mainer
 Down Easter or Downeaster
 Mainiac

Geography of Maine 

Geography of Maine

 Maine is: a U.S. state, a federal state of the United States of America
 Location
 Northern hemisphere
 Western hemisphere
 Americas
 North America
 Anglo America
 Northern America
 United States of America
 Contiguous United States
 Canada–US border
 Eastern United States
 East Coast of the United States
 Northeastern United States
 New England
 Population of Maine: 1,328,361  (2010 U.S. Census)

Places in Maine 

Places in Maine
 Historic places in Maine
 National Historic Landmarks in Maine
 National Register of Historic Places listings in Maine
 Bridges on the National Register of Historic Places in Maine
 National parks in Maine
 State parks in Maine

Environment of Maine 

 Climate of Maine
 Protected areas in Maine
 State forests of Maine
 Superfund sites in Maine
 Wildlife of Maine
 Fauna of Maine

Natural geographic features of Maine 

 Islands of Maine
 Lakes of Maine
 Mountains of Maine
 Rivers of Maine

Regions of Maine 
 Southern Maine
 The County

Administrative divisions of Maine 

 The 16 counties of the state of Maine
 Municipalities in Maine
 Cities in Maine
 State capital of Maine:
 City nicknames in Maine
 Towns in Maine

Demography of Maine 

Demographics of Maine

Government and politics of Maine 

Politics of Maine
 Form of government: U.S. state government
 United States congressional delegations from Maine
 Maine State Capitol
 Elections in Maine
 Electoral reform in Maine
 Political party strength in Maine

Branches of the government of Maine 

Government of Maine

Executive branch of the government of Maine 

 Governor of Maine
 Lieutenant Governor of Maine
 Secretary of State of Maine
 State departments
 Maine Department of Transportation

Legislative branch of the government of Maine 

 Maine Legislature (bicameral)
 Upper house: Maine Senate
 Lower house: Maine House of Representatives

Judicial branch of the government of Maine 

Courts of Maine
 Supreme Court of Maine

Law and order in Maine 

Law of Maine

 Cannabis in Maine
 Capital punishment in Maine
 Constitution of Maine
 Gun laws in Maine
 Law enforcement in Maine
 Law enforcement agencies in Maine
 Maine State Police
 Same-sex marriage in Maine

Military in Maine 

 Maine Air National Guard
 Maine Army National Guard

History of Maine 

History of Maine

History of Maine, by period 

Prehistory of Maine
French colony of l'Acadie, 1604–1713
Île Sainte-Croix, 1604–1605
King William's War, 1690–1697
Queen Anne's War, 1702–1713
Treaty of Utrecht, 1713
Le Grand Dérangement, 1755–1763
English Colony of Popham, 1607–1608
English Colony of Massachusetts Bay, 1628–1686
Also claimed by English Colony of New-York, 1664–1673 and 1674–1683
King Philip's War, 1675–1676
Also claimed by English Province of New-York, 1683–1688
English Dominion of New-England in America, 1686–1689
English Colony of Massachusetts Bay, 1689–1692
Also claimed by English Province of New-York, 1689–1692
English Province of Massachusetts Bay, 1692–1707
British Province of Massachusetts Bay, 1707–1776
King George's War, 1740–1748
Treaty of Aix-la-Chapelle of 1748
French and Indian War, 1754–1763
Treaty of Paris of 1763
British Colony of Nova Scotia east of Penobscot River, 1707-(1765–1776)-1867
State of Massachusetts Bay, 1776–1780
Separation of Maine from Massachusetts in 1820
State of Maine becomes 23rd State admitted to the United States of America on March 15, 1820
Republic of Madawaska, 1827–1842
Aroostook War, 1838–1839
American Civil War, April 12, 1861 – May 13, 1865
Maine in the American Civil War
Acadia National Park established on February 26, 1919

History of Maine, by region 

 by city
 History of Portland, Maine
 Railroad history of Portland, Maine

History of Maine, by subject 

 History of Albanians in Maine

Culture of Maine 

 Cuisine of Maine
 Museums in Maine
 Religion in Maine
 Episcopal Diocese of Maine
 Scouting in Maine
 State symbols of Maine
 Flag of the State of Maine 
 Original 1901 Maine Flag 
 Great Seal of the State of Maine

The arts in Maine 
 Music of Maine

Sports in Maine 

Sports in Maine

Economy and infrastructure of Maine 

Economy of Maine
 Communications in Maine
 Newspapers in Maine
 Radio stations in Maine
 Television stations in Maine
 Energy in Maine
 Power stations in Maine
 Solar power in Maine
 Wind power in Maine
 Health care in Maine
 Hospitals in Maine
 Transportation in Maine
 Airports in Maine
 Rail transport in Maine
 Roadways in Maine
State highways in Maine
State routes in Maine

Education in Maine 

Education in Maine
 Schools in Maine
 School districts in Maine
 High schools in Maine
 Colleges and universities in Maine
 University of Maine

See also

Topic overview:
Maine

Index of Maine-related articles

References

External links 

Maine
Maine